Donald Brett Johnstone (born 17 September 1963 in Feilding) is a New Zealand slalom canoer who competed from the mid-1980s to the early 1990s. He finished 25th in the K-1 event at the 1992 Summer Olympics in Barcelona.

External links

1953 births
Canoeists at the 1992 Summer Olympics
Living people
New Zealand male canoeists
Olympic canoeists of New Zealand
People from Feilding
20th-century New Zealand people